Hilt may refer to one of the following.

 Hilt, a detail of a sword.
 Hilt (band), one of several side projects of the seminal Vancouver industrial band Skinny Puppy
Peter Hilt, a former New Zealand politician
Hilt, California, an unincorporated community in Siskiyou County